The Dr. Joseph Y. Porter House is a historic home in Key West, Florida. It is located at 429 Caroline Street. On June 4, 1973, it was added to the U.S. National Register of Historic Places.

The original construction was built in 1838 by Judge James Webb, the first Federal Judge of the Southern District of the Florida Territory. Webb introduced influential legislation regulating salvage, which helped establish wrecking as a legitimate legal business in Florida.

The house is best known as the lifelong home of Dr. Joseph Yates Porter Jr. His father bought the property in 1845. Porter lived in the home for 80 years, dying in the same room he was born. He was Key West's first native-born physician and Florida's first Public Health Officer from 1889 to 1917. He was instrumental in controlling yellow fever, reforming sanitation and quarantine practices, and initiating health legislation. Porter was among the first physicians to recognize yellow fever as transmissible by mosquitoes.

References

External links

Florida's Office of Cultural and Historical Programs
Monroe County listings
Dr. Joseph Y. Porter House

History of Key West, Florida
Houses in Key West, Florida
Landmarks in Key West, Florida
National Register of Historic Places in Key West, Florida
Historic American Buildings Survey in Florida